"If There Were No Benny Cemoli" is a science fiction short story by American writer Philip K. Dick, first published in the December, 1963 issue of Galaxy magazine with illustration by Lutjens. 

"The Proxmen rebuilding war-torn Earth want to prosecute its leaders for war crimes. Benny Cemoli would be the biggest catch of all, if they could just find him. -- Steven Owen Godersky

Plot summary

On the tenth anniversary of a devastating atomic war on Earth, more Proxima Centaurians arrive to continue the rebuilding of the planet. A war crimes tribunal is looking for names of war criminals and a surviving homeopape of The New York Times seems to provide an answer. Benny Cemoli.

Themes 
Per Darko Suvin, "If There Were No Benny Cemoli" has the theme of the "transformation or transubstantiation of classical European fascism into new American power".

Reception
Algis Budrys said that Dick's story "is, as usual, markedly individual, and distinguished for his ability to draw fine-line social caricatures paradoxically freighted with verisimilitude".

Further reading

References

External links 
 
 "If There Were No Benny Cemoli" on the Internet Archive

Short stories by Philip K. Dick
1963 short stories
Fiction set around Proxima Centauri
Works originally published in Galaxy Science Fiction